The 1909 Connecticut Aggies football team represented Connecticut Agricultural College, now the University of Connecticut, in the 1909 college football season.  The Aggies were led by first year head coach S. F. G. McLean, and completed the season with a record of 3–5.

Schedule

References

Connecticut
UConn Huskies football seasons
Connecticut Aggies football